Sintian may refer to:
 The Sintians, an ancient Thracian people
 Sindian, Xindian, in Taiwan, and Sintian Mountain in Taiwan